The 1931 San Diego State Aztecs football team represented San Diego State Teachers College during the 1931 NCAA football season.

San Diego State competed in the Southern California Conference (SCC). The 1931 San Diego State team was led by head coach Walter Herreid in his second season with the Aztecs. They played home games at Navy "Sports" Field. The Aztecs finished the season with five wins, three losses and two ties (5–3–2, 2–2–1 SCC). Overall, the team outscored its opponents 71–45 points for the season. This included shutting out their opponents six times and being shut out three times.

Schedule

Notes

References

San Diego State
San Diego State Aztecs football seasons
San Diego State Aztecs football